ABC 13 may refer to one of the following television stations in the United States:

Current
KHGI-TV, Kearney, Nebraska
KRDO-TV, Colorado Springs, Colorado
KTNV-TV, Las Vegas, Nevada
KTRK-TV, Houston, Texas (O&O)
KUPK, Dodge City, Kansas (Re-broadcasts KAKE (TV) in Wichita, Kansas)
KYUR, Anchorage, Alaska
WBKO, Bowling Green, Kentucky
WHAM-TV, Rochester, New York
WIRT-DT, Hibbing, Minnesota (Re-broadcasts WDIO-DT in Duluth, Minnesota)
WLOS, Asheville, North Carolina
WMBB, Panama City, Florida
WSET-TV, Lynchburg, Virginia
WTVG, Toledo, Ohio
WVEC, Hampton/Norfolk, Virginia
WZZM Grand Rapids, Michigan

Former
KHVO, a satellite station of KITV in Hilo, Hawaii, on channel 13 from 1960 to 2009
KOVR, Sacramento, California, affiliated with ABC from 1957 to 1995
KSWT (now KYMA-DT), Yuma, Arizona, affiliated with ABC from 1991 to 1994
KVIA-TV, El Paso, Texas, on channel 13 from 1956 to 1981
WHBQ-TV, Memphis, Tennessee, affiliated with ABC from 1953 to 1995
WJZ-TV, Baltimore, Maryland, affiliated with ABC from 1948 to 1995
WOWK-TV, Huntington, West Virginia, affiliated with ABC from 1955 to 1958 and again from 1962 to 1986
WORO-DT, San Juan, Puerto Rico, affiliated with ABC from 1984 to 1989
WREX-TV, Rockford, Illinois, affiliated with ABC from 1965 to 1995
WTHR, Indianapolis, Indiana, affiliated with ABC from 1957 to 1979
WNYT (TV), Albany, New York, affiliated with ABC from 1956 to 1977
WVUE-DT, New Orleans, Louisiana, on channel 13 from 1959 to 1962